Argentina held nine presidential elections between 1862 and 1910, every six years.

Background
These elections were all indirectly decided in the electoral college, and not reflective of popular vote (whose turnout averaged 10% of male suffrage). The cosmetic nature of this electoral system, which became known locally as the voto cantado (the "outspoken vote" because of its non secrecy), resulted from a period of intermittent civil wars between those who favored a united Argentina with a strong central government (Unitarians) and Buenos Aires Province leaders who favored an independent nation of their own (Federalists). These conflicts had dominated local political life since 1820, and did not immediately subside with the enactment of the Argentine Constitution of 1853.

The military guarantor of the Argentine Confederation, General Justo José de Urquiza, lost control over his appointed successor, Santiago Derqui, and this led Buenos Aires Governor Bartolomé Mitre to take up arms in defense of autonomy against what he saw as Derqui's reneging on their 1860 gentlemen's agreement. Victorious at the 1861 Battle of Pavón, Mitre obtained important concessions from the national army - notably the amendment of the Constitution to provide for indirect elections through an electoral college comprised - by design - somewhat disproportionately of electors from the nation's hinterland provinces.

1862
A skilled negotiator, Mitre placated restive sentiment in Buenos Aires and Entre Ríos Provinces (where separatist sentiment was highest), and nominated Marcos Paz, a Federalist and former Mitre foe, as his running mate. Arranging an electoral college election on September 4, 1862, he and Paz received the body's unanimous support.

1868
  
Presiding over a prosperous economy overshadowed somewhat by the costly Paraguayan War, President Mitre was at pains to avoid risking the tenuous national unity his administration had secured. Though he hand-picked prospective candidates, Mitre avoided the appearance of direct support for any one figure, while limiting the field to those he considered acceptable. Electors from Buenos Aires Province favored Autonomist Party candidate Adolfo Alsina, who was instead persuaded by Mitre to run for the vice-presidency. The nomination was handed to the Ambassador to the United States, Domingo Sarmiento, who remained at his post and did not campaign. Mitre also supported former Unitarian Party leader Rufino de Elizalde and his running mate General Wenceslao Paunero, a key figure in Mitre's victory at the Battle of Pavón. These candidates were all preferred by the president over that year's dark horse, former President Justo José de Urquiza (whom Mitre attempted to dissuade from running for fear of the separatist conflict his presence might provoke).

These candidates were, with the exception of Sarmiento, contentious in many circles and provided the new system its first real test. The electoral college met on April 12, 1868, and selected Sarmiento by 79 out of 131 votes, making this the only closely contested race during this era.

1874
President Sarmiento's pragmatic approach to Buenos Aires demands and his successful control of separatist revolts in the north paved the way to high office for his vice president, Autonomist Party leader Adolfo Alsina. Alsina gained the support of a sizable facion of Mitre's Nationalist Party, resulting in the formation of the paramount political group in Argentina for the next 42 years: The National Autonomist Party (PAN). Mitre himself did not support Alsina, however, whom he viewed as a veiled Buenos Aires separatist. The elder statesman ran for the presidency again, though the seasoned Alsina outmaneuvered him by fielding Nicolás Avellaneda, a moderate lawyer from remote Tucumán Province. The electoral college met on April 12, 1874, and awarded Mitre only three provinces, including Buenos Aires.

As he had repeatedly up to 1861, Mitre took up arms again. Hoping to prevent Avellaneda's October 12 inaugural, he mutineered a gunboat; he was defeated, however, and only President Avellaneda's commutation spared his life.

1880
 
A leader of the Conquest of the Desert, as well as of the suppression of Mitre's 1874 uprising and others, President Avellaneda had decided on General Julio Roca as his successor, early on. Memories of Mitre's defeat did not sit well with Buenos Aires separatists, and this faction nominated the Governor of Buenos Aires Province, Carlos Tejedor. Roca's April 11, 1880, selection by the electoral college was followed by Tejedor's armed insurrection, and though the latter was defeated, Mitre brokered negotiations between Tejedor's separatists and the national government. These negotiations eventually result in the Federalization of Buenos Aires in September, stabilizing the powerful province's position within Argentina.

1886
Confident of his authority following six years of peace and prosperity, President Roca was by then known for his shrewdness as "the fox." Enjoying the support of the agricultural elites - as well as of the London financial powerhouse, Barings Bank - Roca daringly fielded his brother-in-law, Córdoba Province Governor Miguel Juárez Celman, as the PAN candidate for president. A number of distinguished candidates appeared, including Buenos Aires Governor Dardo Rocha and Foreign Minister Bernardo de Irigoyen. Roca tolerated no opposition against his dauphin, however, who was selected nearly unanimously on April 3, 1886.

1892
An 1888 massacre of a May Day gathering and an unprecedented financial crisis led to the formation of the first meaningful opposition to develop as reform movements in urban areas, culminating in the Revolution of the Park that forced Juárez Celman's 1890 resignation. These developments gathered speed when the Civic Youth Union became the Radical Civic Union (UCR), in 1891. Instability also prompted moderates from within the PAN to advance a diplomat, Roque Sáenz Peña, as the nominee. Roca foiled this move by persuading former Supreme Court Chief Justice Luis Sáenz Peña (Roque's father) to run - forcing the young reformist to withdraw. The UCR's appeal, for its part, helped lead President Carlos Pellegrini (who replaced the besieged Juárez Celman) to declare a state of siege a week before the April 10, 1892, elections. The resulting UCR electoral boycott left the ruling PAN as the only party on the ballot, handing its nominee the presidency unanimously.

1898

Having obtained the aging Luis Sáenz Peña's resignation in favor of Vice President José Evaristo Uriburu (who was good stead with both Roca and Mitre), Roca once again carried the PAN standard in 1898. The UCR, which had lost its founder, Leandro Alem, to suicide in 1896, was divided between those who backed Senator Bernardo de Irigoyen's drive to form coalitions with more conservative parties, and those who supported the party's new leader, Hipólito Yrigoyen (who boycotted this and future "election songs" - establishing what later became known as the UCR's "break before bending" policy). Public debate was heated on the eve of the January 30 elections to a constitutional assembly entrusted to increase the number of congressmen and cabinet members, as well before the April 10, 1898, general election. The electoral college yielded no surprises, though, and Roca was returned to the presidency.

1904
Riding high after another term of prosperity and important diplomatic accomplishments such as the May 1902 Pact with neighboring Chile over a border dispute and Foreign Minister Luis Drago's settlement of imminent war between the German Empire and Venezuela, President Roca enlisted Congressman Manuel Quintana as the PAN standard bearer. Within the PAN itself, some dissent was evident over Roca's dominance. These voices rallied behind former Presidents Carlos Pellegrini (as an Autonomist) and José Evaristo Uriburu (as a Republican). The UCR maintained its boycott, and the aging Quintana was selected by the electoral college on April 10, 1904.

The year's legislative elections were more historically significant than the headline presidential selection: the Buenos Aires district of La Boca elected Alfredo Palacios, the first Socialist Congressman in the western hemisphere.

1910
The ailing President Quintana's death in 1906 was the beginning of the end of Roca's dominance of national politics and policy. Moderate opposition to the PAN had greatly eroded its majorities in Congress, the very day the president died, and within months, Bartolomé Mitre and Carlos Pellegrini were dead, as well. President José Figueroa Alcorta defied Roca by signing many of Congressman Palacios' labor law reform bills and by 1909, Figueroa Alcorta was poised to nominate the reformist who had been turned away in 1892: Roque Sáenz Peña.

Other prominent conservatives, such as La Nación publisher Emilio Mitre and Buenos Aires Governor Marcelino Ugarte, presented token candidacies. Sáenz Peña, who was the Ambassador to Italy and did not campaign, was selected unanimously on April 12, 1910. He promptly began negotiations with UCR leader Hipólito Yrigoyen for the introduction of legislation providing for universal male suffrage and the secret ballot. The president struggled over the bill with a still-conservative Congress, and on February 10, 1912, the Senate narrowly passed Law 8871. Providing for free and fair elections, as well as for the country's first uniform system of voter registration, the Sáenz Peña Law brought the prolonged "outspoken vote" to an end.

See also 
 Politics of Argentina
 List of political parties in Argentina

References

1862-1910
Argentina
Argentina
Argentina
Argentina
Argentina
Argentina
Argentina
Argentina
Argentina